was a Japanese video game developer based in Tokyo responsible for the creation of a wide array of scrolling shooters and other arcade games. The company was founded in 1979 but its gaming division was established in 1984 by former Orca and Crux employees, who wanted to make games, after both companies declared bankruptcy. Their first shoot 'em up game, Tiger-Heli (1985) on arcades, was a success and helped establish Toaplan as a leading producer of shooting games throughout the 1980s and 1990s that would continue to characterize their output.

Though initially exclusive to arcades, they expanded with the Sega Genesis in 1990. The company ceased development of shoot 'em up projects before declaring bankruptcy in 1994. Several offshoot developers such as Tamsoft, Eighting, CAVE, Gazelle, and Takumi Corporation were formed prior to and after the closure, while former members later joined to other studios such as Bandai Namco Entertainment, Capcom, Square Enix and Taito. Toaplan has since earned recognition from critics, being called one of the greatest and most influential Japanese shoot 'em up developers and "master" of the scrolling shooter genre.

History 

Toaplan was established in April 1979 but its gaming division was established by former Orca and Crux members. Performan was created by most of the same team that previously worked on several projects at Orca and Crux before both companies declared bankruptcy, after which a group of employees from the two gaming divisions would go on to form Toaplan and among them were composers Masahiro Yuge and Tatsuya Uemura.

In 1992, Yoshiyuki Kiyomoto stepped down from his position as CEO at Toaplan, with Taizo Hayashi now serving as the company's president. Toaplan provided consultance and advising to Raizing (now Eighting) during the development of Sorcer Striker, as well as licensing their arcade board to the company, since the president of the latter company previously served as an employee of the former. Snow Bros. 2: With New Elves served as one of the final projects to be developed by Toaplan, as the company ceased development of shoot 'em up games before their closure.

The company declared bankruptcy on March 31, 1994. Its closure led to the formation of several offshoot companies. Prior to Toaplan's closure in 1994, several former employees formed or were involved with multiple companies, many of which were dedicated to arcade shooters: Tamsoft, Raizing, CAVE, Gazelle, and Takumi (who continued development of Twin Cobra II after Toaplan's closure).

The rights to nearly every Toaplan IP are currently owned by Tatsujin, a Japanese company formed by Yuge. In 2019, Japanese company M2 announced that in 2020 they will release every game by Toaplan (excluding Mahjong Sisters and Enma Daiō) for consoles in Japan. In August 2022, Tatsujin was acquired by Embracer Group for a retro gaming focused operative group.

Staff 
Various individuals have been important figures in the history of Toaplan:

 Masahiro Yuge – One of the six original team members and frequent composer. Later worked at Takumi Corporation and Eighting on several projects.
 Tatsuya Uemura – One of the six original team members and frequent composer. Later worked at Gazelle and Eighting on several projects.
 Toshiaki Tomizawa – Music composer for Demon's World, Zero Wing and Vimana. Co-founder of CAVE.
 Osamu Ōta – Music composer for Wardner, Rally Bike and Twin Hawk. Producer of Gekirindan at Taito.
 Toshiaki Ōta – One of the six original team members and head of software development. Founder of Tamsoft.
 Naoki Ogiwara – Artist and designer for Truxton and Out Zone. Co-founder of CAVE.
 Kōetsu Iwabuchi – Artist for Guardian and Twin Cobra. Later served as planning manager for Grind Stormer.
 Yuko Tataka – Character designer for Truxton, Hellfire, Twin Hawk, Zero Wing and Fire Shark.
 Sanae Nitō – Character designer for Truxton, Hellfire, Twin Hawk, Zero Wing and Fire Shark.
 Tsuneki Ikeda – Programmer for Grind Stormer and Batsugun. Co-founder of CAVE.
 Satoshi Kōyama – Programmer for Batsugun. Later worked at CAVE on several projects.
 Junya Inoue – Designer for Dogyuun, Knuckle Bash and Batsugun. Later worked at Gazelle and CAVE on several projects.
 Yusuke Naora – Graphic designer for Grind Stormer. Later worked at Square Enix on several projects.
 Kenichi Takano – One of the six original team members and designer for Performan. Co-founder of CAVE.
 Yuichirō Nozawa – One of the six original team members and designer for Twin Hawk.
 Atsushi Kawaguchi – One of the six original team members and artist for Demon's World.
 Nanpei Kaneko – Designer for FixEight and Knuckle Bash. Later worked as illustrator for Japanese magazines.
 Tomonobu Kagawa – One of the three graphic artists for Truxton II. Later worked at Taito on several projects.

Games

Developed

Published

Cancelled

Notes

References

External links 

  

Defunct video game companies of Japan
Software companies based in Tokyo
Video game companies disestablished in 1994
Video game development companies